Challen is a given name. Notable people with the name include:

Challen Cates (born 1969), American independent film producer and actress 
Challen Skeet (1895–1978), English first-class cricketer

See also
Challen, surname